Mykola Mykolayovych Mykhailov (1903 – June 16, 1936) was a Ukrainian bandurist, composer and arranger.

Biography 
Born in 1903, Mykola Mykolailovych Mykhailov completed his studies at the Kiev Muz-dram Institute in 1929.

He joined the Kiev Bandurist Capella and in 1934 he became the artistic director of the ensemble. At that time it had only tem members. In February 1935, the Kiev Bandurist Capella was combined with members of the Poltava Bandurist Capella. Mykhailov was given the task of directing the Exemplary State Bandura Capella which now consisted of 29 performers.

He was the author of numerous arrangements and adaptions of works by other composers for the Capella.

Ethnically he was of mixed Russian-Greek extraction but proved himself a patriotic Ukrainian.

He died under strange circumstances during a tour of the Caucasus in Tashkent on 16 June 1936.

Sources
Kudrytsky, A. V. - Mystetsvo Ukrainy - Biohrafichnyj dovidnyk, K, 1997

Bandurists
Kobzarstvo
1903 births
1936 deaths
Ukrainian composers
Soviet composers